Almond Eyes is the first extended play by American contemporary worship musician Brandon Lake. The EP was released on February 5, 2021, via Bethel Music. The album was produced by David Leonard, Brad King, Seth Talley, and Lael.

Background
Brandon Lake released Almond Eyes on February 5, 2021, without prior promotion in the lead-up to its release. The extended play was released as a surprise tenth wedding anniversary gift to his wife, Brittany.

Track listing
All tracks were written by Brandon Lake, except where noted. All tracks were produced by David Leonard, Brad King, and Seth Talley, except where noted.

Release history

References

External links
 

2021 EPs
Brandon Lake albums